I Am Not a Doctor is the second album by the English/Irish electronic dance music duo Moloko, released in 1998. The album received critical praise, although it was not a big seller. I Am Not a Doctor was issued in the UK by Echo Records. The songs on the album built upon the electronic pop of Moloko's first album, Do You Like My Tight Sweater?, with further experimentation in drum and bass and synthpop.

Included on I Am Not a Doctor is "Sing It Back", a track which entered the UK Singles Chart twice, becoming a top ten single in 1999 after being remixed by Boris Dlugosch and experiencing massive success in nightclubs. Although "Sing It Back" was released in the US by Warner Bros. Records and reached number one on the Billboard Hot Dance Club Play chart, the album was not released there after the failure of "Day for Night (Blakdoktor Afterglow Mix)" as a single.

Singles
 "The Flipside" (#53 UK)
 "Sing It Back" (#4 UK, #1 US Dance)
 "Knee Deepen" (promo)

Track listing

Charts

References

Moloko albums
1998 albums